Korei (Sl. No.: 53) is a Vidhan Sabha constituency of Jajpur district, Odisha.

Area of this constituency includes Byasanagar, Korei block and 9 GPs (Bhotaka, Laxminagar, Pahanga, Badakainchi, Gandhan, Tikarpada, Bahadalpur, Narasinghpur and Mugupal) of Rasulpur block.

Ashok Kumar Bal of Biju Janata Dal Represents the constituency after 2019 assembly elections.

Elected Members

11 elections have been held during 1974 to 2014. The elected members from the Korei constituency are:
2019: (52): Ashok Kumar Bal (BJD)
2014: (52): Akash Das Nayak (BJD)
2009: (52): Pritiranjan Ghadai (BJD)
2004: (25): Sanchita Mohanty (BJP) 
2000: (25): Ashok Kumar Das (JD (S)) 
1995: (25): Ashok Kumar Das (Janata Dal) 
1990: (25): Ashok Kumar Das (Janata Dal) 
1985: (25): Rama Chandra Khuntia (Congress)
1980: (25): Niranjan Jena (JNP (S))
1977: (25): Ashok Kumar Das (Janata Party)
1974: (25): Ashok Kumar Das (Utkal Congress)

2019 Assembly Election 

Elections to Korei constituency was held along with 2019 General elections on 29 April. The vote counting was held on 23 May. Biju Janata Dal candidate Ashok Kumar Bal defeated Bharatiya Janata Party Candidate Biswajeet Nayak by margin of 30724 votes.

2014 Election Results
In 2014 election, Biju Janata Dal candidate Akash Das Nayak defeated Indian National Congress candidate Biswajeet Nayak by a margin of 42,867 votes.

Summary of results of the 2009 Election

In 2009 election, Biju Janata Dal candidate Pritiranjan Ghadai defeated Indian National Congress candidate Hemalata Khuntia by a margin of 25,112 votes.

Notes

References

Assembly constituencies of Odisha
Jajpur district